Oscar Redding (born c. 1974) is an Australian actor, screenwriter and director.

Biography 
Portrayed Alexander Pearce in Van Diemen's Land (2009). He also co-wrote the film with director Jonathan auf der Heide.

Redding directed the Australian film The Tragedy of Hamlet Prince of Denmark (2007), which he also adapted from the stage version that he directed. A modern version of Shakespeare's play. It was screened at the Melbourne International Film Festival in early August 2007.

Television credits include, but are not limited to, The Secret Life of Us, SeaChange, Stingers, Last Man Standing, Blue Heelers, Neighbours, Ponderosa, Backlands, Top of the Lake and Puberty Blues.

Personal life 
Oscar Redding lives in Melbourne.

See also
Hamlet on screen

References

External links

The Australian – Doomed prince of Bourke St. mall
Melbourne International Film Festival – The Tragedy of Hamlet Prince of Denmark
The New Hamlet Film 2007
Hamlet as Film: The Rest is Static, interview with Oscar Redding

1974 births
Australian male film actors
Australian male television actors
Australian film directors
English-language film directors
Australian screenwriters
Living people
20th-century Australian male actors
21st-century Australian male actors